This is a comparison of processors based on the ARM family of instruction sets designed by ARM Holdings and 3rd parties, sorted by version of the ARM instruction set, release and name.

ARMv6

ARMv7-A 

This is a table comparing central processing units which implement the ARMv7-A (A means Application) instruction set architecture and mandatory or optional extensions of it, the last AArch32.

ARMv8-A 

This is a table of 64/32-bit  central processing units which implement the ARMv8-A instruction set architecture and mandatory or optional extensions of it. Most chips support the 32-bit ARMv7-A for legacy applications. All chips of this type have a floating-point unit (FPU) that is better than the one in older ARMv7-A and NEON (SIMD) chips. Some of these chips have coprocessors also include cores from the older 32-bit architecture (ARMv7). Some of the chips are SoCs and can combine both ARM Cortex-A53 and ARM Cortex-A57, such as the Samsung Exynos 7 Octa.

See also
 List of ARM processors
 List of products using ARM processors

Notes

References